Buford High School may refer to:

Buford High School (Georgia), a high school in Buford, Georgia
Buford High School (South Carolina), a high school in Lancaster, South Carolina